Aleksey Aleksandrovich Ostapenko (born 26 May 1986) is a volleyball player from Russia.

He was born in Saratov.

Ostapenko competed at the 2008 Summer Olympics, where Russia claimed the bronze medal.

References

External links
 
 
 

1986 births
Living people
Russian men's volleyball players
Volleyball players at the 2008 Summer Olympics
Olympic volleyball players of Russia
Olympic bronze medalists for Russia
Olympic medalists in volleyball
Medalists at the 2008 Summer Olympics
Sportspeople from Saratov
20th-century Russian people
21st-century Russian people